Mary Ann Taylor-Hall is an American fiction writer and poet. She is the author of two novels, a book of short fiction, three collections of poetry, and has published widely in literary journals. She has lived on a farm in Kentucky for many years and was married to poet James Baker Hall.

Biography
Mary Ann Taylor-Hall was born in Chicago, Illinois, in 1937. Her family moved to Winter Haven, Florida, when she was seven and she received her early education there. She attended Wesleyan College, in Macon, Georgia, and graduated with a B.A in English from the University of Florida. She received her M.A. in English literature from Columbia University. Afterwards, she taught at Auburn University, the University of Kentucky, the University of Puerto Rico, and Miami University of Ohio. She was married to writer James Baker Hall, who died in 2009. She has lived on a farm on the Harrison-Scott County line in Central Kentucky for the past forty years.

Writing
Taylor-Hall's most recent book of poetry, Out of Nowhere: New and Selected Poems, was published in December 2017 by Old Cove Press and is distributed by Small Press Distribution. Two previous collections of poetry, Dividing Ridge (Larkspur Press, 2008) and Joy Dogs (Press on Scroll Road, 2013). were published in handset letterpress limited editions. Her first novel Come and Go, Molly Snow (University Press of Kentucky, 2009) (W.W. Norton & Company, 1995) was a Barnes & Noble Discover Great New Writers selection. Her second novel At The Breakers was published in 2009 by the University Press of Kentucky. Her collection of short fiction, How She Knows What She Knows about Yo-Yos, (Sarabande Books, 2000) was a Foreword Magazine Book of the Year. Her work has been published in The Paris Review, The Kenyon Review, The Sewanee Review, Ploughshares, Shenandoah and other literary quarterlies, and has been anthologized in The Best American Short Stories and in the book Home and Beyond: An Anthology of Kentucky Short Stories, edited by Morris A. Grubbs (University Press of Kentucky, 2001). She is the recipient of a PEN/Syndicated Fiction Award and has received grants from the National Endowment for the Arts and the Kentucky Arts Council.

Publications

Fiction
At The Breakers (University Press of Kentucky, 2009) 
How She Knows What She Knows about Yo-Yos (Sarabande Books, 2000) 
Come and Go, Molly Snow (W.W. Norton & Company, 1995) (University Press of Kentucky, 2009)

Poetry
Out of Nowhere: New and Selected Poems (Old Cove Press, 2017) 
Joy Dogs (Press on Scroll Road, 2013)
Dividing Ridge (Larkspur Press, 2008)

Nonfiction
 Missing Mountains (Wind Publications, 2005) with Bobbie Ann Mason and Kristin Johannsen

Further reading
Interview with Mary Ann Taylor-Hall,March 30, 1998.Louie B. Nunn Center for Oral History, University of Kentucky

References

1937 births
Living people
20th-century American novelists
21st-century American novelists
Novelists from Kentucky
People from Chicago
People from Winter Haven, Florida
20th-century American poets
21st-century American poets
20th-century American short story writers
21st-century American short story writers
Female models from Kentucky
20th-century American women writers
21st-century American women writers